Poeppel or Pöppel is a surname. Notable people with the surname include: 

Augustus Poeppel (1839–1891), Australian surveyor and explorer
David Poeppel (born 1964), German psychologist
Ernst Pöppel (born 1940), German psychologist and neuroscientist 
Johannes Poeppel (1921–2007), German Army general